Trzebiełuch  is a village in the administrative district of Gmina Stolno, within Chełmno County, Kuyavian-Pomeranian Voivodeship, in north-central Poland. It is located in Chełmno Land within the historic region of Pomerania.

Transport
The Polish National road 55 passes through the village, and the A1 motorway runs nearby, east of the village.

Notable residents
Karl Strecker (1884-1973), Wehrmacht general

References

Villages in Chełmno County